Greenglass is a surname. Notable people with the surname include:

David Greenglass (1922–2014), American scientist and Soviet spy
Ruth Greenglass (1924–2008), American Soviet spy